Izaia Perese (born 17 May 1997) is an Australian professional rugby union footballer playing for the Waratahs in Super Rugby, who previously played for the Queensland Reds and a short stint with the Brisbane Broncos in the NRL.

Background
Perese was born in Brisbane, Queensland, Australia.

He played his junior rugby league for Brisbane Brothers in Stafford and attended Wavell State High School. In 2013, Perese played for the Norths Devils in the Cyril Connell Cup and represented the Queensland under-16 rugby league team, while holding a scholarship with the North Queensland Cowboys.

While attending Anglican Church Grammar School, he played alongside future NRL players Kalyn Ponga, Jaydn Su'A and Brodie Croft, as well as future professional Rugby Union players in Liam Wright, Angus Scott-Young, Mack Mason and Harley Fox in their 2014 title-winning first XV team. Later that year, he was selected for the Australian Schoolboys rugby union team.

In March 2020 Perese pleaded guilty to supplying a dangerous drug in September 2019, but had a probation order for drug charges removed by a court to allow him to travel overseas.

Rugby union career
In 2015, Perese began playing for Queensland Country in the National Rugby Championship. In 2016, he joined the Queensland Reds senior squad, playing 17 games over three seasons. In August 2017, he was named in the Wallabies squad for The Rugby Championship but did not play a game.

In December 2018, Perese was released from the last year of his contract with the Reds.

In May 2020 Izaia Perese announced his return to Rugby Union, playing for Bayonne in the French top 14.

Perese signed on with the Waratahs until 2024

Rugby league career

2019
Perese joined the Brisbane Broncos on a train-and-trial deal, later earning a full-time NRL contract with the club. He began the season playing for the Redcliffe Dolphins in the Queensland Cup, representing the Queensland Residents side in their win over New South Wales.

In round 22 of the 2019 NRL season, Perese made his NRL debut for Brisbane in their 24–12 win against the Penrith Panthers at Suncorp Stadium in Brisbane.

2020
On 18 February, Perese was stood down indefinitely by the Brisbane club after being charged by police with drug-related offences.  Perese was later granted bail and is due back in court on 9 March 2020.  Brisbane CEO Paul White released a statement saying “Standing down Izaia is not a judgement of his guilt or innocence, but recognition that this is a serious matter, We have discussed our course of action and the reasoning behind it with Izaia, and he understands the action we have taken.  We will review the matter as it moves through the legal process".

References

External links

1997 births
Living people
Australian people convicted of drug offences
Australian rugby league players
Australian rugby union players
Australia international rugby union players
Australian sportspeople of Samoan descent
Aviron Bayonnais players
Brisbane Broncos players
New South Wales Waratahs players
People educated at Anglican Church Grammar School
Queensland Country (NRC team) players
Queensland Reds players
Redcliffe Dolphins players
Rugby league centres
Rugby league players from Brisbane
Rugby league wingers
Rugby union centres
Rugby union players from Brisbane
Rugby union wings